William Campbell Walker, CMG (1837 – 5 January 1904) was a New Zealand politician.

Biography
Walker was born in 1837, at Bowlandstow, Midlothian, Scotland, the eldest son of Sir William Stuart Walker (KCB). He received his education at Trinity College, Glenalmond in Perthshire and then at Trinity College, Oxford. He graduated in 1861 and then completed a further MA degree. Together with his brother, he emigrated to New Zealand and arrived in Lyttelton on board the Evening Star in January 1862. The brothers then owned and ran a sheep farm at Mount Possession in South Canterbury. When they bought the land, Walker was assigned some land in Riccarton. He later gave the land away, so that a settlement for working-class people could be established.

Walker married Margaret Wilson the daughter of Archdeacon James Wilson. They were to have five sons and one daughter.

Walker was the first chairman of the Ashburton County Council from 1877 until 1893. He represented the Ashburton electorate on the Canterbury Provincial Council in the 5th and 7th Council (14 June 1866 – 27 September 1867; 8 April 1874 – 31 October 1876). He was appointed to the Legislative Council by the Liberal Government on 15 October 1892. He was reappointed on 15 October 1899. He was a member of the Executive Council (20 February 1896 – 23 June 1903), Minister of Immigration (2 March 1896 – 20 June 1903) and Minister of Education (11 March 1896 – 20 June 1903). While he was a minister, he mostly lived in Wellington. He was created a Companion of the Order of St Michael and St George (CMG) in June 1901, on the occasion of the visit of TRH the Duke and Duchess of Cornwall and York (later King George V and Queen Mary) to New Zealand.
Walker ended his career as the Speaker of the Legislative Council from 9 July 1903 until his death.

He was a member of the Board of Governors of Canterbury College. As a member of the cabinet, he was instrumental in passing the act that provided for the separation of the Agricultural College from the college proper. He was a member of the Land Board of Canterbury from 1891 until 1896.

Walker died on 5 January 1904 and was buried three days later at Sydenham Cemetery. He was survived by his wife and his six children.

Notes

References

|-

|-

1837 births
1904 deaths
Members of the New Zealand House of Representatives
New Zealand MPs for South Island electorates
Members of the Cabinet of New Zealand
New Zealand education ministers
Speakers of the New Zealand Legislative Council
New Zealand Liberal Party MLCs
Members of the New Zealand Legislative Council
People from Midlothian
People educated at Glenalmond College
People from Ashburton, New Zealand
Burials at Sydenham Cemetery
Unsuccessful candidates in the 1890 New Zealand general election
19th-century New Zealand politicians